Diploderma is a genus of lizards in the family Agamidae. Species of Diploderma are native to Myanmar, China, Vietnam, Taiwan, and Japan. Most of the species are found in China, including many endemics.

Species
The following 42 species are recognized as being valid:

Nota bene: a binomial authority in parentheses indicates that the species was originally described in a genus other than Diploderma.

References

Further reading
Hallowell E (1861). "Report upon the Reptilia of the North Pacific Exploring Expedition, under command of Capt. John Rogers, U. S. N." Proceedings of the Academy of Natural Sciences of Philadelphia 12: 480-510. (Diploderma, new genus, p. 490; D. polygonatum, new species, pp. 490-491).

Diploderma
Lizard genera
Taxa named by Edward Hallowell (herpetologist)